John Hendry Park is 27-hectare park in the city of Vancouver, British Columbia, Canada. It's operated by the Vancouver Park Board and the Grandview Community Association. Locals often refer to the park informally as Trout Lake, due to the lake itself being its largest feature. It’s a focal point of the Cedar Cottage neighbourhood.

History 
The park was one of Vancouver's first lumbering operations in the late 19th century. The lake was the water source for the Hastings Sawmill, which was owned by industrialist John Hendry. In 1926, Hendry's daughter, who was married to then-governor of BC Eric Hamber, donated the mill property to the Park Board with the condition that it be named after her father.

In 1963, the Grandview Community Centre, located near Victoria Drive, was constructed. The community centre was renovated in 1977 and renamed Trout Lake Community Centre.

In 2010, the new ice rink and renovations were completed for the 2010 Winter Olympics as the training venue for figure skating, with contributions of $13.15 million from the Park Board, $2.5 million from the Vancouver Organizing Committee for the 2010 Olympics (VANOC), and $250,000 from the Grandview Community Association. However, the real cost of the ice rink is estimated at $15.9 million.

Facilities 

Trout Lake
Located at 2100 block East 19th Avenue just off of Victoria Drive
 Lifeguards from May to September
 No boating allowed
 Designated swimming area
 26,000-square-metre dog off-leash area (north end of lake)
John Hendry Park
 1 grass & 1 gravel soccer field
 5 baseball diamonds
 2 concession stands
 2 washrooms
 Picnic area
 BBQs are permitted
 Free parking
 Biking trails
 Walking & jogging trails
 2 playgrounds
 Basketball courts
 Tennis courts

Trout Lake Community Centre
Located at 3300 Victoria Drive and E 15th Avenue
 Ice rink
 Gym facilities
 Game room
 Weight room
 Sauna
 Classrooms
 Hall

Activities 
 First Nations pow-wow
 Trout Lake Farmers Market (hosted in the community centre's parking lot) 
 Parade of Lost Souls (during Halloween season)
 Outdoor performances (at the beach during summer months)

See also 
 Bodies of water in Vancouver
 Hydrology map of Trout Lake

References 

Parks in Vancouver